Muchnice  is a village in the administrative district of Gmina Strzelce, within Kutno County, Łódź Voivodeship, in central Poland.

The village has a population of 250.

References

Muchnice